Langhorne Wesley Wister (September 20, 1834 – March 19, 1891) was a Union Army officer during the American Civil War.

Wister was born in Germantown, Philadelphia, Pennsylvania on September 20, 1834. His father, William Wister, was for many years treasurer of the North Pennsylvania Railroad.  Langhorne was educated at the Germantown Academy. At the age of 18 he established his home in Duncannon, Pennsylvania where he engaged in the manufacture of iron.

He enlisted in the Union Army at the outbreak of war. Langhorne Wister served as a captain in the 13th Pennsylvania Reserve Regiment, fighting at the Battle of Gaines's Mill, where he was wounded.  In this role he also fought with distinction at the Battle of Fredericksburg.

Later Wister recruited and served as colonel of the 150th Pennsylvania Infantry ("Bucktail") Regiment.  He fought at the Battle of Chancellorsville in I Corps of the Army of the Potomac.  Wister assumed command of a brigade on the first day of the Battle of Gettysburg after Colonel Roy Stone was wounded. Wister too was wounded in the mouth with a minie ball during Pickett's Charge and had to give up command. He, however, reported on the battle for the brigade. After service at the Battle of Mine Run, Wister returned to Duncannon, Pennsylvania.

On July 9, 1866, President Andrew Johnson nominated Wister for appointment to the grade of brevet brigadier general of volunteers, to rank from March 13, 1865, and the United States Senate confirmed the appointment on July 23, 1866.

Upon returning to Duncannon, Wister resumed work at the iron business and became a partner in L. & R. Wister & Co.  In 1874 he was made the Republican candidate for Congress from the 18th district, but was defeated by William S. Stanger, Democrat, by 1023 majority.

Wister died of meningitis at the family home Belfield Mansion in Philadelphia, Pennsylvania on March 19, 1891.  He is buried at Laurel Hill Cemetery, Philadelphia, in Section L, Lot 316-318.

See also

 Battle of Gettysburg
List of American Civil War brevet generals (Union)

References

1834 births
1891 deaths
Burials at Laurel Hill Cemetery (Philadelphia)
Union Army colonels
Wister family
Neurological disease deaths in Pennsylvania
Infectious disease deaths in Pennsylvania
Deaths from meningitis